Nicholas Nye is a poem by British poet Walter de la Mare. It was published in the year 1931. It has a total of 40 lines. It is written for children aged around 9–10 years. It is a six stanza poem in which the poet is the first person from view and visits an orchard and finds a donkey named 'Nicholas Nye'. He observes and describes the donkey 'Nicholas Nye' and discovers that he and the donkey are very similar. He explains the miseries and difficulties the donkey has to face for example being unwanted and alone.

References

Works by Walter de la Mare
English poems
1931 poems
Children's poems
Fictional donkeys